General Ludlow may refer to:

George Ludlow, 3rd Earl Ludlow (1758–1842), British Army general
William Ludlow (1843–1901), U.S. Army major general

See also
Edgar Ludlow-Hewitt (1886–1973), Royal Air Force Air Chief Marshall